Fatima is a 2015 French-Canadian drama film directed by Philippe Faucon. It was screened in the Directors' Fortnight section at the 2015 Cannes Film Festival. It won the Prix Louis-Delluc for Best Film in December 2015. It received four nominations at the 41st César Awards and won Best Film, Most Promising Actress and Best Adaptation.

Cast
 Soria Zeroual as Fatima
 Zita Hanrot as Nesrine
 Kenza Noah Aïche as Souad
 Chawki Amari as Father
 Dalila Bencherif as Leila
 Edith Saulnier as Séverine

Reception

Critical reception
On review aggregator website Rotten Tomatoes, the film holds an approval rating of 84% based on 25 reviews, and an average rating of 6.8/10. On Metacritic, the film has a weighted average score of 69 out of 100, based on 9 critics, indicating "generally favorable reviews".

Accolades

References

External links
 

2015 films
2015 drama films
2010s French-language films
French drama films
2010s Arabic-language films
Films about Islam
Canadian drama films
Films based on non-fiction books
Louis Delluc Prize winners
Best Film César Award winners
Films directed by Philippe Faucon
2015 multilingual films
French multilingual films
Canadian multilingual films
2010s Canadian films
2010s French films